Tibor Koroknai (born 24 January 1990) is a Hungarian athlete specialising in the 400 metres hurdles. He represented his country at four consecutive European Championships.

His personal best in the event is 49.24 seconds set in Berlin in 2018.

His younger brother, Máté, is also a hurdler.

International competitions

References

External links

1990 births
Living people
Hungarian male hurdlers
European Games competitors for Hungary
Athletes (track and field) at the 2019 European Games
Hungarian Athletics Championships winners
21st-century Hungarian people